The 2010–11 season is Sampdoria's 64th in existence, and eighth consecutive season Serie A. Sampdoria finished the 2009–10 Serie A season in fourth place.

Sampdoria competed in the UEFA Champions League for the first time since finishing runner-up in 1991–92.

The season was a disastrous one relative to the success of 2009–10, with the club suffering relegation following the January departures of star players Antonio Cassano and Giampaolo Pazzini.

Pre-season and friendlies

A total of 29 players gathered for the beginning of pre-season training at Moena on 6 July.

1 Match played in three 30-minute segments.

Serie A

Matches

Coppa Italia

Based on their finish in the 2009–10 season, Sampdoria began the 2010–11 Coppa Italia in the round of 16.

Champions League
By finishing in fourth position in Serie A, Sampdoria will play in the play-off round of the Champions League. The draw for the play-off round took place on 6 August. Sampdoria were unseeded in the non-Champions route of the draw. They were drawn against four time German champions Werder Bremen.

The first leg, played at Weserstadion in Bremen, was won 3–1 by the home side. Werder Bremen scored all three of their goals in the second half, including a 67th minute penalty from Torsten Frings. The penalty was given after Stefano Lucchini brought down Sebastian Prödl in the area. Lucchini was given a second yellow card for the foul, which led to his sending off. In the last moments of the match, Giampaolo Pazzini gave Sampdoria some hope with an away goal.

The return at Stadio Luigi Ferraris in Genoa saw Sampdoria jump out to an early lead on a pair of Giampaolo Pazzini goals. Antonio Cassano scored a late goal to put Sampdoria ahead 3–0 in the match and ahead 4–3 on aggregate score. In added time, Werder Bremen answered back through Markus Rosenberg to force extra time. In the first half of extra time, Claudio Pizarro scored giving Werder Bremen a 5–4 lead on aggregate. Sampdoria were unable to respond, and they were eliminated from Champions League play.

Werder Bremen won 5–4 on aggregate.

Europa League
As a result of their elimination from the Champions League, Sampdoria entered the 2010–11 UEFA Europa League in the group stage.

The draw took place on 27 August. Sampdoria were drawn to play in Group I along with PSV from the Netherlands, Ukrainian club Metalist Kharkiv and Hungarian club Debrecen. They finished a distant third in the group, with only one win, against Debrecen.

Note 1: Debrecen played their group matches in Budapest at Stadium Puskás Ferenc as Debrecen's Stadion Oláh Gábor Út did not meet UEFA criteria.

Squad statistics
As of 22 May (end of the season)

1Disciplinary record for all competitions.

References

2010-11
Italian football clubs 2010–11 season
2010–11 UEFA Europa League participants seasons